St Mary and St. Antonios Coptic Orthodox Church (Coptic:  transliteration: ti.eklyseya en.remenkimi en.orthodoxos ente fi.ethowab Maria nem fi.ethowab Antonios) is located in Ridgewood, Queens and was the oldest Coptic Orthodox parish in Queens. It is one of  the 287 Coptic Orthodox Churches in the United States.

History
St. Mary & St. Antonios Church, being one of the oldest Coptic Orthodox churches in North America, started in March 1972, and is the first Coptic Orthodox parish in New York as well as the third Coptic parish in the US, the first two being St. Mark Coptic Orthodox Church in Jersey City and St. Mark Coptic Orthodox Church in Los Angeles. After a few months, however, St. George Coptic Orthodox Church was established in Brooklyn, and eventually, Coptic parishes started popping up throughout New York City as well as up-state New York. This led to the establishment of about 15 Coptic Orthodox Churches in New York State.

After the church was built, in a pastoral visit by Pope Shenouda III, the parish was consecrated in September 1989. The liturgies are currently held by three priests, as there are over 300 Coptic families served by St. Mary & St. Antonios Church.

References

External links
The official website of St. Mary & St. Antonios Coptic Orthodox Church
The official Facebook Page of St. Mary & St. Antonios Coptic Orthodox Church
The Coptic Orthodox Archdiocese of North America
Directory & Statistics on Coptic Orthodox Churches in North America

See also
Coptic Orthodox Church
List of Coptic Orthodox Churches in the United States
St. Mark Coptic Orthodox Church (Jersey City, New Jersey)
St. George Coptic Orthodox Church (Brooklyn)
St. Abraam Coptic Orthodox Church (Woodbury, New York)
St. George & St. Shenouda Coptic Orthodox Church (Jersey City, New Jersey)

Christian organizations established in 1972
Churches in Queens, New York
Coptic Orthodox churches in New York (state)
Egyptian-American culture in New York City
Oriental Orthodox congregations established in the 20th century
Ridgewood, Queens